Hutchison Hill is a hill  northeast of Lampitt Nunatak on Avery Plateau, Graham Land, Antarctica. This hill is one of the few features on the plateau that is readily visible from Darbel Bay. It was named by the UK Antarctic Place-Names Committee in 1960 for Sir Robert Hutchison, an English physician who made outstanding contributions to knowledge of the scientific principles of nutrition.

References

Hills of Graham Land
Loubet Coast